Michael Wayne Morrison (born August 24, 1970) is an American author, software developer, and toy inventor. He is best known for his books on topics including Internet design and development, mobile device usage, and game programming.

Morrison's writing career began in the early 1990s and coincided with the release of the Java programming language. He embraced the Java technology and wrote and contributed to numerous Java books, as well as developing several online Java courses. His first book was actually Windows 95 Game Developer's Guide Using the Game SDK, which was the first book to explore and demystify Microsoft's new (at the time) DirectX game development technology. He co-authored his first book with his close friend and former college roommate, the late Randy Weems, who Morrison credits with a great deal of his technical knowledge. Morrison quickly followed up this book by serving as lead author of Java Unleashed, which quickly became a best-seller. He went on to write books on numerous Web-related technologies such as HTML, XML, CSS, and JavaScript, and also ventured into end-user writing by authoring books on Pocket PC, BlackBerry, and Treo handheld devices.

Morrison was born in Nashville, Tennessee. He has a B.A. from Tennessee Technological University in Electrical Engineering, although he credits the school with little beyond serving as the place where he met his wife and a handful of close friends.

Bibliography 
 Windows 95 Game Developer's Guide
 Java Unleashed
 Teach Yourself Internet Game Programming with Java in 21 Days
 Tricks of the Java Programming Gurus
 Presenting ActiveX
 Java Developer's Reference
 Teach Yourself Java in 21 Days Professional Reference Edition
 VBScript Web Page Interactivity
 Late Night Visual J++
 Presenting JavaBeans
 How to Program JavaBeans
 Java 1.1 Unleashed, 3rd Edition
 Microsoft Visual InterDev Unleashed
 Teach Yourself More Java in 21 Days
 Professional Edition Using HTML 4, XML, and Java 1.2
 Java 1.2 Class Libraries Unleashed
 The Complete Idiot's Guide to Java 2
 Teach Yourself MFC in 24 Hours
 MFC Programming with Visual C++ 6 Unleashed
 Teach Yourself DirectX 7 in 24 Hours
 Teach Yourself Windows Script Host in 21 Days
 XML Unleashed
 IE 5 Web Programming Unleashed
 Unauthorized Guide to Pocket PC
 Java 2 in Plain English
 Teach Yourself Wireless Java with J2ME in 21 Days
 HTML and XML for Beginners
 Teach Yourself XML in 24 Hours, 2nd Edition
 Special Edition Using Pocket PC 2002
 Teach Yourself SVG in 24 Hours
 Teach Yourself Game Programming in 24 Hours
 Faster Smarter HTML and XML
 Teach Yourself HTML and XHTML in 24 Hours, 6th Edition
 JavaScript Bible, 5th Edition
 Beginning Game Programming
 Beginning Mobile Phone Game Programming
 BlackBerry In a Snap
 Treo Essentials
 Teach Yourself XML in 24 Hours, 3rd Edition
 Teach Yourself HTML & CSS in 24 Hours
 Head First JavaScript

References 

American technology writers
Writers from Tennessee
American computer programmers
1970 births
Living people
Tennessee Technological University alumni
People from Nashville, Tennessee